Codiolum is a genus of green algae, in the family Ulotrichaceae. The term is also used for a life cycle stage in some algae.

References

External links

Ulotrichaceae
Ulvophyceae genera